Wolf Gang was a British alternative and symphonic rock band with Max McElligott as lead vocalist. Having played with different musicians, McElligott settled on a live set up in late 2009 which included Lasse Petersen (drums) previously of The Rakes, Gavin Slater (guitar) and James Wood (bass). When playing live the band also toured with a keyboard player, at one time Beau Holland.

Wolf Gang's first album, Suego Faults was released in July 2011 on Atlantic Records. In February 2013, the band signed a worldwide record deal with American label Cherrytree Records, an imprint of Interscope Records, and wrote and recorded their second album the same year. The album was produced by Flood at Assault & Battery in London and will be released in 2014. An EP titled Black River featuring three tracks from the album was released in April. On 8 October, Wolf Gang announced that their new album Alveron would be coming out on 21 October.

On 27 July 2015, Wolf Gang announced through their Facebook page that the band had decided to split, citing that it was time for the members to "move on to other things."

History
Prior to his music career, McElligott was a student at the London School of Economics where he studied social anthropology, when he decided to take a year off to try music. Suego Faults was recorded by McElligott, all the parts and instruments were played by him. He is proficient in playing the piano, his first instrument, as well as guitar, bass, drums, keyboards, trumpet and other instruments. The songs on the album were put together by McElligott and Dave Fridmann, producer of The Flaming Lips, MGMT and Mercury Rev. The two share co production credit on the album sleeve.

The album was generally well received, garnering 5 stars from Artrocker, 8 out of 10 from NME and 4 out of 5 stars from Uncut, The Fly, Evening Standard, Scotland on Sunday, The Scotsman.

The band also received praise from The Guardian, Spin Magazine, The Fader & Pitchfork. In 2012, Wolf Gang was number 95 in GQs "100 Best Things In The World" listing.

Performances
Wolf Gang toured and played with some of the music industry's biggest names, including Coldplay, The Killers, Florence and the Machine, Keane, Metric, The Naked and Famous, Ellie Goulding and Miike Snow. They have headlined the UK twice, once to promote their debut album and the second as the headline act for the influential NME Radar Tour in late 2011. They have also both headlined and supported tours in Europe and North America. They played in Australia as part of Parklife Festival in 2010, and have performed their own sold out shows in New Zealand. Their latest tour of the US in October 2012 began with a sold out show at the prestigious Troubadour venue in LA, and ended up with a sold out show in Austin, Texas. Other notable shows include;

Two sold out headline shows at London's White Heat night.

Supporting The Naked and Famous as part of the NME Awards in February 2011, and subsequent support on their UK and German tour.

Supporting Editors on 26 March 2011 at the Royal Albert Hall in aid of the Teenage Cancer Trust.

Supporting The Killers for Hard Rock Calling, in June 2011 at London's Hyde Park.

Supporting Scissor Sisters at the Olympia Theatre in June 2011 at Arthur's Day Music Festival, in Dublin.

Festival slots include Rock en Seine, Lowlands, V Festival, Glastonbury, Bestival, T in the Park, Slottsfjell, Pukkelpop, London Calling and SXSW
A sold out show at the final show of the NME Radar Tour at London's KOKO.

In April 2012 they played Coachella in Palm Springs.

Opened for Coldplay on the second leg of their 'Mylo Xyloto' tour of the United States in the summer of 2012.

Main support for Keane's arena tour of England in November and December 2012.

In January 2014 Wolf Gang announced they would be supporting Bastille on their May/June tour of the US.

Airplay
BBC Radio 1's Zane Lowe premiered the single 'Lions in Cages' on his show on 4 October 2010.

Max McElligott also appeared on Nick Grimshaw's Radio 1 pop quiz and sat on the panel of Nihals Radio 1 review show.

The band received airplay in the UK from the likes of Absolute Radio, XFM, BBC 6 Music, BBC Radio 2 and BBC Radio 1.

'Lions in Cages', along with the 2011 single 'Dancing with the Devil' was added to the BBC Radio 1 B List in 2011 where it was played by Fearne Cotton, Greg James, Scott Mills and Chris Moyles.

'Lions in Cages' was used as the Theme Song for new British TV Occult Comedy 'Switch', which started airing in October 2012.

The theme song for the BBC television football program for Final Score was Wolf Gang's "The King and All His Men" from 2011 to 2013

In the US 'Lions in Cages' features in a year-long 2012 nationwide TV campaign for General Motors and has also featured on the hit TV show Gossip Girl twice. The title track from the album 'Suego Faults' was used in the final scene of the closing episode of the series.

Fashion collaborations
The band were associated with a range of high end fashion labels, most notably Burberry who after having them perform an acoustic version of the song "Back to Back" invited them back to perform a stripped back acoustic set for their Fashion's Night Out event in September 2011. In June 2011 they played Emporio Armani's Summer Live gig supporting Plan B. More recently Wolf Gang performed at American designer Thom Browne's collection preview for Harrods.

Discography

Albums 
Suego Faults (2011)
Alveron (2014)

Singles

References

External links

English indie rock groups
Musical groups from London